The Moray Group is a stratigraphic group, a set of geological rock strata of Paleocene to Eocene age, found beneath the North Sea and in the Faroe-Shetland Basin. Two sequences are recognised, a shelf succession consisting of sandstones and siltstones of the Dornoch Formation and a thicker basinal succession consisting of mainly mudstones of the Sele Formation and the Balder Formation.

References 

Geological groups of the United Kingdom
Paleogene System of Europe